Albert Burger may refer to:

 Albert Bürger (firefighter) (1913–1996), German fire official
 Albert Burger (alpine skier) (born 1955), German Olympic alpine skier
 Albert Burger (politician) (1925–1981), German politician

See also
 Albert Berger, film producer